The Magdalena River (less commonly ) is the main river of Colombia, flowing northward about  through the western half of the country. It takes its name from the biblical figure Mary Magdalene. It is navigable through much of its lower reaches, in spite of the shifting sand bars at the mouth of its delta, as far as Honda, at the downstream base of its rapids. It flows through the Magdalena River Valley.

Course 

The Magdalena River is the largest river system of the northern Andes, with a length of 1,612 km. Its headwaters  are in the south of Colombia, where the Andean subranges Cordillera Central and Cordillera Oriental separate, in Huila Department. The river runs east then 
north in a great valley between the two cordilleras.

Flora and fauna

Fish 

The Magdalena River basin, which includes the Cauca River and other tributaries, are very rich in fish. , 213 fish species were known from the basin. Since then several new species have been described from the basin such as five Hemibrycon in 2013, two Ancistrus in 2013 and a Farlowella in 2014. Among the more famous species in the basin are Kronoheros umbriferus, Ctenolucius hujeta, Geophagus steindachneri, Ichthyoelephas longirostris, Panaque cochliodon, Pimelodus blochii, Potamotrygon magdalenae, Prochilodus magdalenae, Pseudoplatystoma magdaleniatum and Salminus affinis. About 55% of the fish species in the basin are endemic, including four endemic genera: The catfish Centrochir and Eremophilus, and the characids Carlastyanax (often included in Astyanax) and Genycharax. In general, the fish fauna shows connections with surrounding basins, notably Atrato and Maracaibo, but to a lesser extent also Amazon–Orinoco.

The most productive fishing areas in Colombia are in the basin, but there has been a drastic decrease in the annual harvest with a fall of about 90% between 1975 and 2008. The primary threats are pollution (such as human waste, mining, farming and deforestation causing siltation) and habitat loss (such a dams). Additional dams are being constructed, including El Quimbo (opened in 2015) and Ituango (expected operational in 2018), which has caused some controversy. As a result of the pollution, heavy metals have also been detected in some commercially important fish in the river. , 19 fish species in the river basin were recognized as threatened.

Other animals 

The Magdalena River and its valley crosses a wide variety of ecosystems, like páramo in its headwaters, dry forest in the upper part of its valley, rainforest in its middle course, and swamps and wetlands in its lower course. The spectacled caiman, green iguana and brown pelican are abundant in these ecosystems but other animal species like the West Indian manatee, Magdalena tinamou, Todd's parakeet, American crocodile, Colombian slider, Magdalena River turtle, Dahl's toad-headed turtle and red-footed tortoise are in danger of extinction.

In addition, there is a possible risk posed by invasive hippopotamus. Originally imported by Pablo Escobar, these hippopotami became feral following his demise, and have since expanded beyond their original home on Hacienda Napoles into nearby regions of the Magdalena River.

History 

Due to its geographical position in the north of South America, the Magdalena River was since precolumbian times a route towards the interior of present-day Colombia and Ecuador. Several Carib-speaking peoples such as the Panche and the Yariguí ascended through the western bank of the river, while its eastern portion was inhabited by the Muisca civilization, which called the river Yuma.

Likewise, the Spanish conquistadores who arrived to today's Colombia early in the 16th century used the river to push to the wild and mountainous inland after Rodrigo de Bastidas discovered and named the river on April 1, 1501. During the Spanish colonization of the Americas, the river was the only transport link communicating Bogotá with the Caribbean Sea port Cartagena de Indias and thus with Europe.

The Magdalena Campaign of Pierre Labatut and Simón Bolívar took place along the Magdalena River.

In 1825, the Congress of Colombia awarded a concession to establish steam navigation in the Magdalena River to Juan Bernardo Elbers, but his company closed shortly after. By 1845, steamboats regularly travelled on the river until 1961, when the last steamers ceased operation.

In mass media 
Much of the film Love in the Time of Cholera takes place in the historic, walled city of Cartagena in Colombia. Some screenshots showed the Magdalena River and the Sierra Nevada de Santa Marta mountain range.

The General in His Labyrinth, by Gabriel García Márquez, is a fictionalized account of the final voyage of Simón Bolívar down the Magdalena River, where he revisits many cities and villages along the river.

In Magdalena: River of Dreams (Knopf, 2020), Canadian writer, anthropologist, and explorer Wade Davis travels the length of the river by boat, on foot, by car, and on horseback combining descriptions of nature with episodes from Colombian history.

References 

 
Rivers of Colombia
Ramsar sites in Colombia